Ormara (Balochi and), is a town in Gwadar District in the Balochistan province of Pakistan. It is a port on the Makran coastal region. This port is also mentioned in Periplus of the Erythraean Sea as Oraea.

History 

Going towards Gwadar through the Makran Coastal Highway, Ormara comes in midway between Karachi and Gwadar. Its historical routes are linked with Alexander the Great, who stayed there with his army for a few days on his way back from the Indus region after conquering the lands of Sindh, Punjab and the Khyber Pakhtunkhwa regions of modern-day Pakistan in 400 BC. One of his generals, Ormoz, died there, and the present-day city was named after him.

For a few centuries, Ormara remained a battle field between the Baloch Sardar (local feudal) and foreign aggressors. Before independence, it was part of the state of Las Bela and afterward in 1975, it became part of the Makran Division. Being an isolated town, it remained undeveloped; however, after construction of the Makran Coastal Highway and Jinnah Naval Base, life has taken a positive change for the locals with many local industries and the resultant increase in jobs available for the locals. It has a population of about forty thousand people and still offers a traditional look at how the ancients lived. Most residents make their livelihood from fishing; a few of them also work in Middle Eastern countries. Ormara has witnessed considerable growth in recent years, especially with the foundation of the Makran Coastal Highway, which integrated the area more with the mainstream Pakistani economy and major urban centres allowing for an easier transport of goods, commerce and people.

Transport 
Ormara has a port and fish harbour. The Jinnah Naval Base of the Pakistan Navy is located at Ormara. Ormara Airport (ORW) is domestic airport with connections to the rest of Pakistan. The Makran Coastal Highway links Ormara with Karachi to the east and Gwadar to the west.

Military 
 Ormara Cantonment
 Jinnah Naval Base
 Cadet College Ormara
 PNS Darmaan Jah Hospital

Gallery

See also 
 Ormara Turtle Beaches
 List of lighthouses in Pakistan
 Oraea

References

External links 
 Ormara satellite image

Coastal cities and towns in Pakistan
Populated places in Gwadar District
Port cities and towns in Pakistan